Mamane Ali nicknamed Atcha is a Nigerien former international footballer of the 1970s and 1980s. He played for Zumunta AC.

References

Nigerien footballers
Niger international footballers
Association footballers not categorized by position
Year of birth missing